The 2017 Norwegian Football Cup Final was the final match of the 2017 Norwegian Football Cup, the 112th season of the Norwegian Football Cup, the premier Norwegian football cup competition organized by the Football Association of Norway (NFF). The match was played on 3 December 2017 at the Ullevaal Stadion in Oslo, and opposed two Eliteserien sides Lillestrøm and Sarpsborg 08. Lillestrøm defeated Sarpsborg 08 3–2 to claim the Norwegian Cup for a sixth time in their history and a first since 2007.

Route to the final

(ES) = Eliteserien team
(D1) = 1. divisjon team
(D2) = 2. divisjon team
(D3) = 3. divisjon team

Match

Details

See also
2017 Norwegian Football Cup
2017 Eliteserien
2017 1. divisjon
2017 in Norwegian football

References

External links 
 Cup final at altomfotball.no

2017
Lillestrøm SK matches
Sarpsborg 08 FF matches
Football Cup
Sports competitions in Oslo
December 2017 sports events in Europe
2010s in Oslo
Final